Locust Hill is an unincorporated community in Middlesex County, Virginia, United States. Locust Hill has a post office with ZIP code 23092, which opened on March 20, 1852.

References

Unincorporated communities in Middlesex County, Virginia
Unincorporated communities in Virginia